Orestias may refer to:

 Orestiada, a town in the Evros regional unit, Greece 
 the ancient Greek city of Orestias, now in Turkey
Orestias (fish), a genus of South American fishes in the family Cyprinodontidae
Orestias (plant), a genus of African plants in the family Orchidaceae